was a Japanese physician who served as 11th President of the Japan Medical Association for 25 years from 1957 to 1982, and also served as president of the World Medical Association from 1975 to 1976.

Life
Takemi completed his M.D. in 1930 from Keio University School of Medicine. He went to RIKEN to study the application of nuclear physics to medicine under Yoshio Nishina who was a famous physicist in Japan. He built the first portable electrocardiograph in 1937, and was also known for his invention of the vectorcardiograph in 1939. Also a medical researcher, he patented several laboratory processes, and was a member of the research and survey team which investigated effects of the atomic bombing of Hiroshima in 1945.

He became a clinician in Ginza, Tokyo in 1939, and served as a visiting professor at Keio, Kitasato, and Tokai universities in Japan, and advised the Japan Science and Technology Agency. In 1982, he was appointed a visiting professor at the Harvard School of Public Health, but was unable to fulfill the commitment due to illness. He died in Tokyo in December 1983.

The Takemi Program in International Health at the Harvard School of Public Health was established in 1983 and is named after him. The Takemi Memorial Hall was established by the Japan Radioisotope Association in Takizawa, Iwate in 1989.

Awards and honours
Takemi received numerous honors and awards include the following:
Order of the Southern Cross
Knight Commander of the Order of the British Empire (KBE)
Order of Merit of the Italian Republic (OMRI)
Silver Medal from Pope Paul VI

Facts
His son, Keizo Takemi, is a politician.

Notes and references

Japanese nuclear medicine physicians
20th-century Japanese inventors
Honorary Knights Commander of the Order of the British Empire
Keio University alumni
Academic staff of Keio University
Harvard University staff
1904 births
1983 deaths
Physicians from Tokyo
Riken personnel